Sidney (often shortened to Sid) is an English given name deriving from the surname, itself of two different derivations depending on the origins of the family. In some cases a place name, itself from Old English, meaning "wide water meadow", and in others from the French place name "St. Denis".

Sidney became widely used as a given name in English speaking countries during the 19th century. It was popularised in the United States after the American Revolution due to admiration for the English politician Algernon Sidney as a martyr to royal tyranny; since its peak in the 1910s it has declined steadily. Sydney is also a spelling variant of the name, whatever the gender, including Cydney and Cidney for a girl. Also, from the early 1990s and 2000s the name Sidney was itself a fashionable name given to girls.

People
Notable people with the given name include:

Sidney Abrahams (1885–1957), British long jumper
Sidney Barthelemy (born 1942), American politician
Sidney Bechet (1897–1959), American jazz saxophonist
Sidney Beckerman (disambiguation), several people
Sidney Bernstein (disambiguation), several people
Sid Caesar (1922–2014), actor and comedian
Sidney Carroll (1913–1988), American film and television scriptwriter
Sidney Robertson Cowell (1903–1995), American ethnomusicologist
Sidney Crosby (born 1987), Canadian ice hockey player
Sidney Cooke (born 1927) Serial killer and leader of the "Dirty Dozen"
Sidney Duteil (born 1955), French musician and television and radio host
Sidney Easton (1885–1971), American actor, playwright and composer
Sid Eudy, professional wrestler known as "Sycho" Sid Vicious/Justice
Sidney Fox (1907–1942), American stage and film actress
Sid Field (1904–1950), English comedy entertainer
Sid Gepford (1895–1924), American football halfback
Sid Gillman (1911–2003), American football player and coach
Sidney Leslie Goodwin (1910–1912), English child who perished in the Titanic disaster
Sidney Gordin (1918–1996), Russian-born American artist, professor
Sid Gordon (1917–1975), American major league baseball All-Star player
Sidney Govou (born 1979), French football player
Sid Hadden (1877–1934), English cricketer
Sidney Hertzberg (1922–2005), American pro basketball player
Sidney Mttron Hirsch (1884–1962), American model and playwright
Sidney Homer (1864–1953), American composer
Sidney William Jackson (1873–1946), Australian ornithologist
Sid James (1913–1976), South African-born English film and television actor
Sidney Jones (American football) (born 1995), American football player
Sidney Knott (1933–2020), South African cricketer
Sidney Lanier (1842–1881), American musician, poet and author
Sidney Lee (1859–1926), English biographer, writer and critic
Sid Luckman (1916–1998), American NFL Hall of Fame football player
Sidney Lumet (1924–2011), American film director
Sidney Magal (born 1953), Brazilian singer and actor
Sidney McKnight (born 1955), Canadian boxer
Sid Meier (born 1954), game developer, famous for his Civilization series
Sidney Meyers (1906–1969), American film director
Sidney Mobell (1926–2022), American artist, jeweler, and philanthropist
Sidney Moncrief (born 1957), American basketball player
Sidney Moraes (born 1977), Brazilian footballer
Sidney Myer (1878–1934), Australian businessman and philanthropist
Sidney Nolan (1917–1992), Australian artist
Sidney Arnold Pakeman (1891–1975), British soldier, professor and politician
Sidney Phillips (1924–2015), American soldier and physician
Sidney Poitier (1927–2022), American actor
Sidney Ponson (born 1976), Aruban baseball pitcher
Sidney Powell (born 1955), American attorney
Sidney Pullen (1895– 1950), English football (soccer) player
Sidney Rittenberg (1921–2019), American journalist
Sidney Sheldon (1917–2007), American writer and producer
Sidney Souza (born 1972), Brazilian footballer
Sidney Spencer (born 1985), American basketball player
Sidney Tannenbaum (1925–1986), American basketball player
Sid Terris (1904–1974), American lightweight boxer
Sidney Topol (1924–2022), American innovator and entrepreneur
Sidney Veysey (born 1955), Canadian ice hockey player
Sidney Wicks (born 1949), American basketball player
Sid Wilson (born 1977), American DJ, keyboardist and pianist

See also
 Sidney (surname)
 Sydney (name)

Notes

English given names
English unisex given names
English masculine given names
English feminine given names